Death in Small Doses may refer to:
 Death in Small Doses (1957 film), by Joseph M. Newman
 Death in Small Doses (1995 film), by Sondra Locke
 "Ring Once for Death", released in the United States as "Death in Small Doses", a 1974 episode of the British series Thriller
 "Death in Small Doses", a song from Tonic Breed's 2010 album On the Brink of Destruction